Memories of Rain is an English-language book written by Sunetra Gupta. This was Gupta's debut novel and was first published in 1992. The book was awarded Sahitya Akademi Award in 1996.

References

External links 

Sahitya Akademi Award-winning works
Indian English-language novels
1992 novels
1992 Indian novels
1992 debut novels